Tukupa Ke Taa’i Hau Tapuha (born 10 December 2001) is a New Zealand professional rugby league footballer who plays as a  for the Cronulla Sharks in the NRL.

Background 
Hau Tapuha was born in Pukekohe and played his junior rugby league for the Valleys Diehards in Brisbane. Hau Tapuha is of Tongan Māori descent. 

Hau Tapuha attended Wavell State High School and represented the Queensland Schoolboys side before being signed by the Sydney Roosters.

Playing career

Early career
In 2015, Hau Tapuha represented the Brisbane Stingers under-14 side while playing for Valleys. In 2018, he played for the Redcliffe Dolphins in the Mal Meninga Cup.

In 2019, Hau Tapuha moved to Sydney, playing for the Roosters SG Ball Cup side. In 2020, he moved up to the club's Jersey Flegg Cup side. On 15 December 2020, he re-signed with the Roosters until the end of the 2022 season.

2021
Hau Tapuha began the 2021 season playing for North Sydney in the NSW Cup.

In round 9 of the 2021 NRL season, Hau Tapuha made his first grade debut for the Sydney Roosters against Parramatta.

References

External links
Sydney Roosters profile

2001 births
Living people
New Zealand rugby league players
North Sydney Bears NSW Cup players
Rugby league players from Auckland
Rugby league props
Sydney Roosters players